Ptosima is a genus of "jewel beetles" in the subfamily Polycestinae.

Species
 Ptosima abyssa (Wickham, 1912)
 Ptosima bowringii Waterhouse, 1882
 Ptosima chinensis Marseul, 1867
 Ptosima embrikstrandina Obenberger, 1936
 Ptosima gibbicollis (Say, 1823)
 Ptosima idolynae Frost, 1923
 Ptosima indica Laporte & Gory, 1835
 Ptosima laeta Waterhouse, 1882
 Ptosima schaeffer (Wickham, 1912)
 Ptosima strandi Obenberger, 1924
 Ptosima sylvatica Wickham, 1914
 Ptosima undecimmaculata (Herbst, 1784)
 Ptosima walshii LeConte, 1863

References

Buprestidae genera